Ambia may refer to :

Places and jurisdictions in Africa
 Ambia (Mauretania), an ancient former bishopric and present Latin Catholic titular see
 Ambia, Ihosy, Madagascar, a town
 Ambia, Mahabo, Madagascar, a town

Places and jurisdictions elsewhere
 Ambia, Indiana, US, a town
 Ambia, Texas, US, an unincorporated community
 Ambía River, a tributary of the Arnoia River in Spain
 Ambia (Anosy), a river in Madagascar

Other
 Ambia (moth), a genus of moths